Andrée Melly (15 September 1932 – 31 January 2020) was an English actress.

Career
Born in Liverpool, Lancashire, she performed at the Old Vic in Romeo and Juliet, The Merchant of Venice and T.S. Eliot’s Murder in the Cathedral in her early twenties and worked with Peter Finch and Robert Donat at the theatre. In 1958, she appeared with the Jamaican actor Lloyd Reckord in the Ted Willis play Hot Summer Night, a production which was later adapted for the Armchair Theatre series in 1959 and in which she was a participant in the earliest known interracial kiss on television. She continued to appear on British television until 1991. Her other stage work includes the original West End production of the farce Boeing-Boeing at the Apollo Theatre in 1962 with David Tomlinson and as Alice "Childie" McNaught in The Killing of Sister George at St Martin's in 1966.

Melly appeared in British films, including the comedy The Belles of St. Trinian's (1954) and the Hammer Horror film The Brides of Dracula (1960). Her role in the later film was as Gina, a woman who is bitten by Baron Meinster, a vampire, turning her into another undead character.

Melly played Tony Hancock's girlfriend in two series of the  Hancock's Half Hour (1955–56) radio series replacing Moira Lister. From 1967 to 1976, she was a regular panellist in the BBC radio comedy Just a Minute. Along with Sheila Hancock, she was one of the most regular female contestants, appearing in fifty-four episodes between 1967 and 1976. In 1972, she chaired an episode. She was the first panellist to win points for talking for the prescribed 60 seconds without hesitation, repetition or deviation. She also appeared in several episodes of The Benny Hill Show.

Personal life
Her brother, George Melly, was a jazz singer. She latterly lived in Ibiza with her husband Oscar Quitak. The marriage produced two children.

With the death of Bill Kerr in 2014, Melly was the last surviving regular cast member of Hancock's Half Hour. Melly died on 31 January 2020 at the age of 87. Her husband survived her.

Filmography

References

External links

Just a Minute Information site (Archived 25 October 2009)

1932 births
2020 deaths
Actresses from Liverpool
English stage actresses
English film actresses
English radio actresses
English television actresses